Ailbhe is an Irish name. It was originally a male name, and was frequently anglicized as Albert (a name to which it is etymologically unrelated), but is now more commonly a female name. Famous bearers of the name include:

 Ailbhe, another name for Saint Ailbe (died 528)
 Ailbhe of Ceann Mhara (died 814), cleric
 Ailbe Ua Maíl Mhuaidh (died 1223), bishop
 Ailbhe Garrihy, Irish social media influencer
 Ailbhe Mac Shamhráin (1954–2011), historian and Celticist
 Ailbhe Smyth (born 1946), academic, feminist, and LGBTQ activist
 Ailbhe Ní Ghearbhuigh (born 1984), poet
 Ailbe, the dog in The Tale of Mac Da Thó's Pig